Boniville (also Agoodé) is a village of Aluku Maroons in the commune of Papaïchton located on the Lawa River in French Guiana.

History
On 25 May 1891, the Aluku, a tribe of escaped slaves from Suriname, became French citizens, and Granman Ochi became the first officially recognized paramount chief of the tribe. In 1895, Ochi founded the village of Boniville to serve as the administrative centre for the tribe.

In 1965, Granman Tolinga moved the capital from Boniville to Papaïchton, and as of 1993, Boniville is a village within the commune of Papaïchton. The village has lost its importance, and has been reduced to a small hamlet. In 2017, five traditional houses in Boniville and Loca were restored by the National Forests Office.

Transport
Papaïchton can only be accessed by plane from the Maripasoula Airport, or by boat via the Lawa river. There is an unpaved path to Maripasoula. On 20 July 2020, construction has started on a proper road which is scheduled to be completed by 2021.

Notes

References

Bibliography
 
 

Aluku settlements
Papaichton
Villages in French Guiana